Silvaș River may refer to:
 Silvaș River (Rica), in Covasna County, Romania
 Silvaș River (Strei), in Hunedoara County, Romania